The Egmont Group of Financial Intelligence Units is an international organization that facilitates cooperation and intelligence sharing between national financial intelligence units (FIUs) to investigate and prevent money laundering and terrorist financing. National FIUs collect information on suspicious or unusual financial activity and are responsible for processing and analyzing the information received. FIUs are normally not law enforcement agencies themselves, findings are shared with appropriate law enforcement or prosecution bodies if sufficient evidence of unlawful activity is found. The Egmont Group is headquartered in Toronto, Ontario, Canada.

History 
The Egmont Group was formed in 1995 as an informal network of 24 national FIUs, taking its name from the Egmont Palace in Brussels where the group's founding meeting took place. The Egmont Group Secretariat established its permanent headquarters in Toronto on 15 February 2008. The Secretariat also maintains additional offices in the Canadian capital Ottawa.

Purpose 
The goal of the Egmont Group is to provide a forum for FIUs around the world to improve cooperation in the fight against money laundering and financing of terrorism and to foster the implementation of domestic programs in this field. The Egmont Group provides support to member FIUs by:
 expanding and systematizing international cooperation in the reciprocal exchange of information
 increasing the effectiveness of FIUs by offering training and promoting personnel exchanges to improve the expertise and capabilities of personnel employed by FIUs
 fostering better and secure communication among FIUs through the application of technology, such as the Egmont Secure Web (ESW)
 fostering increased coordination and support among the operational divisions of member FIUs
 promoting the operational autonomy of FIUs
 promoting the establishment of FIUs in conjunction with jurisdictions with an AML/CFT program in place, or in areas with a program in the early stages of development

Member FIUs 

The US Treasury Department defines an FIU as "a central, national agency responsible for receiving (and, as permitted, requesting), analyzing and disseminating to the competent authorities, disclosures of financial information: concerning suspected proceeds of crime and potential financing of terrorism, or required by national legislation or regulation, in order to counter money laundering and terrorism financing."

The current member FIUs of the group are:

Notable non-member observers
The Egmont Groups admits governmental or intergovernmental organizations as non-member observers whose roles relate to preventing money-laundering and/or the financing of terrorism. Several notable organizations are observers, including:
 Common Market for Eastern and Southern Africa
 Cooperation Council for the Arab States of the Gulf
 European Commission
 Europol
 International Monetary Fund
 Organization for Security and Co-operation in Europe
 United Nations Office on Drugs and Crime
 World Bank
 World Customs Organization

See also 
 Financial intelligence
 Money laundering

References

External links
 

Financial crime prevention
Funding of terrorism
International organizations based in Canada
International economic organizations
1995 establishments in Belgium
Anti-money laundering measures
Organizations based in Toronto